In the 2012–13 season, Partizan mt:s Belgrade competed in the Basketball League of Serbia, the Radivoj Korać Cup, the Adriatic League and the Euroleague.

Players

Current roster

Depth chart

Roster changes

In

Out

Statistics

Adriatic League

Euroleague

Updated: 14 December 2012

Competitions

Basketball League of Serbia

Semifinals

Final

Radivoj Korać Cup

Quarterfinals

Semifinals

Final

Adriatic League

Standings 

Pld – Played; W – Won; L – Lost; PF – Points for; PA – Points against; Diff – Difference; Pts – Points.

Regular season

Semifinal

Final

Euroleague

Standings

Regular season

Individual awards
Adriatic League

MVP of the Round
 Vladimir Lučić – Round 4
 Vladimir Lučić – Round 6

Basketball League of Serbia

Finals MVP
 Dragan Milosavljević

MVP of the Round
 Bogdan Bogdanović – Round 1
 Dāvis Bertāns – Round 12
 Dragan Milosavljević – Play off, Round 4
 Vladimir Lučić – Play off, Round 6
 Joffrey Lauvergne – Play off, Round 7

References

External links

 Official website 
 

2012–13
2012–13 in Serbian basketball by club
2012–13 Euroleague by club